Woolen Mills Village Historic District is a historic district that was listed on the National Register of Historic Places on April 12, 2010.  The district is in Albemarle County, Virginia and also in Charlottesville, Virginia.

Its area includes parts of Chesapeake, Franklin, Steephill, 18th NE, and East Market Streets and Riverside Avenue in the City of Charlottesville; and parts of  Row and Marchant and East Market Streets in Albemarle County. The district includes Woolen Mills Chapel, previously listed on the National Register.

See also
National Register of Historic Places listings in Charlottesville, Virginia
National Register of Historic Places listings in Albemarle County, Virginia

References

External links
 Woolen Mills Chapel, 1819 East Market Street, Charlottesville, Charlottesville, VA at the Historic American Buildings Survey (HABS)
National Register Historic Nomination Form https://www.dhr.virginia.gov/VLR_to_transfer/PDFNoms/002-1260_Woolen_Mills_HD_2009_NR_Final.pdf

Historic districts in Albemarle County, Virginia
Geography of Charlottesville, Virginia
National Register of Historic Places in Charlottesville, Virginia
National Register of Historic Places in Albemarle County, Virginia
Historic American Buildings Survey in Virginia
Historic districts on the National Register of Historic Places in Virginia